Heosphora is a genus of moths in the family Pyralidae. The genus was first described by Edward Meyrick in 1882.  The type species is Anerastia psamathella Meyrick, 1879, designated as such by George Hampson in 1901. All Heosphora species are found in Australia.

Species 
The species in this genus include:

References 

Pyralidae genera
Taxa named by Edward Meyrick
Taxa described in 1882